Meloidogyne javanica is a species of plant-pathogenic nematodes. It is one of the tropical root-knot nematodes and a major agricultural pest in many countries. It has many hosts. Meloidogyne javanica reproduces by obligatory mitotic parthenogenesis (apomixis).

Hosts 
Meloidogyne javanica is a nematode pathogen that affects over 770 species of plants (Cabi 2018). The hosts of this pathogen include both weeds and crops of economic importance. Those of economic importance include tea, grapevine, vegetables, fruit trees, cereals, and ornamentals (Cabi 2018). Meloidogyne javanica is considered an agricultural pest, as it is extremely abundant and damaging (Alford 2012).

Symptoms 

Because there are so many different hosts for this pathogen, the symptoms are very variable. Common symptoms include abnormal leaf color, abnormal leaf form, wilting leaves, galls, swollen roots, reduced root system, dwarfing and senescence (Cabi 2018). This pathogen does the most damage when present in light soils with hot weather conditions (Alford 2012).

Diagnosis

Morphological characteristics 
Because there are many plant hosts and variable symptoms, it is important when diagnosing Meloidogyne javanica to obtain a specimen of the nematode from symptomatic plant tissue. The most commonly utilized diagnostic techniques are the use of morphological characteristics of the nematode species (Cunha et al. 2018). Head shape and stylet morphology of males are useful characteristics in the identification of M. javanica. When specimens are placed in the lateral position, the distance between the dorsal esophageal gland orifice to the stylet base can be used to distinguish between species of Meloidogyne (Cunha et al. 2018). In the case of M. javanica, the distance between these two features is relatively short (2.0-3.0 um). Additionally, M. javanica can be diagnosed by looking at the perineal pattern of females. The shape of the perineal region, dorsal arch, dorsal striae, lateral lines and phasmids are all characteristics useful in identification.

Biochemical 
Biochemical diagnostic methods are commonly used when diagnosing nematode diseases. One technique frequently utilized is isoenzyme phenotyping (Cunha et al. 2018). Protein extract from M. javanica is applied to a gel electrophoresis to use as a reference phenotype. This analysis is based on the mobility of the enzymes in the extracted protein, which is diagnostic of different species of Meloidogyne (Cunha et al. 2018).

Molecular 
There are many molecular techniques that are becoming increasingly more common, as they are easy, quick, and cheap (Cunha et al. 2018). Species-specific PCR is commonly utilized, which uses species-specific primers to target certain nematodes based on SCAR (sequence-characterized amplified region) (Qiu et al. 2006, Cunha et al. 2018). These markers are used for species-specific diagnosis of Meloidogyne (Cunha et al. 2018).

Management

Biocontrol 
One management strategy being used to control Meloidogyne javanica is a plant growth-promoting bacteria (Escobar et al. 2015). This biocontrol is specifically utilized in tomatoes, where fluorescent pseudomonads produce an antibiotic, 2,4-diacetylphloroglucinol (DAPG). When DAPG is produced, it induces resistance in tomatoes against the root knot nematode, Meloidogyne javanica (Escobar et al. 2015). Another biocontrol with proven success in controlling Meloidogyne javanica is the fungus Trichoderma harzianum. According to Sahbani and Hadavi (2008), the fungus is able to infect nematode eggs and juveniles and destroy them, consequently decreasing nematode infection. Extracts of the beetle Mylabris quadripunctata shows antiparasitic activity in the laboratory against the M. javanica.

Chemical 
Another control strategy that is being utilized is chemical control, however, this is being used less and less due to the toxicity and contamination potential (Escobar et al. 2015). The specific chemical control utilized is nematicide toxins, including Aldicarb, Enzon, Oxamyl, and Cadusafos (Rugby). The most effective nematicide against Meloidogyne javanica is Rugby in a dosage of 8 ppm (Soltani 2013). The chemical control can be used throughout the nematodes life cycle, as the nematicide can kill the nematode at any stage. Additionally, a more recent development in the management of Meloidogyne javanica is seed treatment. Treating seeds with abamectin before planting to has been proven effective against Meloidogyne javanica (Almeida, 2018).

Cultural practices 
A cultural practice used to control Meloidogyne javanica is crop rotation with non-host species or resistant cultivars. Rotation crops such as marigolds, perennial grasses, and bermudagrass have been successful in suppressing the disease caused by M. Javanica (Escobar et al. 2015). This management style is effective when the nematodes are host-specific, as rotating with a non-host crop eliminates the pathogen's ability to infect.

Pathogenesis 
Because Meloidogyne javanica affects many hosts, there are different host-parasite relationships:

Potatoes 
When Meloidogyne javanica infects potatoes, the pathogen specifically infects the tubers and roots. The tubers reveal that the nematode is present in the outermost layer of the tuber, including the vascular ring, and is surrounded by 3-6 large giant cells (Vovlas 2005). In addition, when M. javanica infects the root, the female finds its permanent feeding site where it is surrounded by 3-4 large giant cells. The nematode induces the plant to form large multinucleate giant cells adjacent to the stele tissue, modifying the structure of the vascular cylinder. This hyperplasia in the roots caused the formation of galls (Vovlas 2005).

Wheat 
When M. javanica infects wheat, galls are produced on young and old roots. The roots infested with the pathogen contain 5-6 giant cells with hypertrophic nuclei causing the interruption of vascular bundles in the stellar area (Kheir 1979). Because the nematode body expands when it feeds on the cells, the cortical cells get compressed and the stele structure is modified, causing gall formation (Kheir 1979).

Overall, when M. javanica infects a plant, the plant is instructed by the pathogen to produce giant cells, which modifies the structure of the stele tissue and causes the formation of galls.

Infected plants 
See:
 List of potato diseases
 List of alfalfa diseases
 List of African violet diseases
 List of soybean diseases
 List of lentil diseases
 List of almond diseases
 List of apricot diseases
 List of banana and plantain diseases
 List of butterfly flower diseases
 List of tea diseases
 List of tobacco diseases
 List of sweet potato diseases
 List of sunflower diseases
 List of red clover diseases
 List of primula diseases
 List of pineapple diseases
 List of pigeonpea diseases
 List of Capsicum diseases
 List of pecan diseases
 List of peanut diseases
 List of peach and nectarine diseases
 List of papaya diseases
 List of Jerusalem cherry diseases
 List of hop diseases
 List of hemp diseases
 List of grape diseases
 List of date palm diseases
 List of cineraria diseases
 List of chickpea diseases
 List of foliage plant diseases (Maranthaceae)

References 

 Alford, D.V. 2012. Chapter 4-Miscellaneous Pests. Pests of Ornamental Trees, Shrubs, and Flowers (2): 434–443.
 Almeida, A.A. et al. 2017. Seed treatment for management of Meloidogyne javanica in soybean. Semina: Ciencias Agrarias 38(5): 2995.
 Cunha, T.G. et al. (2018). Diagnostic methods for identification of root-knot nematodes species from Brazil. Ciência Rural 48(2).
 Escobar et al. 2015. Chapter one- Overview of root-know nematodes and giant cells. Advances in Botanical Research 73: 1-32.
 Invasive Species Compendium. 2018. Cabi. Received from: https://www.cabi.org/isc/datasheet/33246.
 Kheir, A., Shafiee, M., & Yassin, M. 1979. The pathogenicity of Meloidogyne javanica to Wheat (Triticum aestivum). Phytopathologia Mediterrane 18:143-146.
 Ornat, C.; Verdejo-Lucas, S.; Sorribas, F. J. (2001-03). "A Population of Meloidogyne javanica in Spain Virulent to the Mi Resistance Gene in Tomato". Plant Disease. 85 (3): 271–276. doi:10.1094/PDIS.2001.85.3.271. ISSN 0191-2917.
 Qiu, J.J., Westerdahl, B.B., Anderson, C., Williamson, V.M. 2006. Sensitive PCR detection of Meloidogyne arenaria, M. incognita, and M. javanica extracted from soil. The Journal of Nematology 38(4): 434–441.
 Sahebani, N., Hadavi, N. 2008. Biological control of the root-knot nematode Meloidogyne javanica by Trichoderma harzianum. Soil Biology and Biochemistry 40(8): 2016–2020.
 Soltani, T., Nejad, R.F., Ahmadi, A.R., Fayazi, F. 2013. Chemical control of root-knot nematode (Meloidogyne javanica) on Olive in greenhouse conditions. Journal of Plant Pathology and Microbiology 4: 183.
 Volvas, N. et al. 2005. Pathogenicity of the root-knot nematode Meloidogyne javanica on potato. Plant Pathology 54(5): 657–664.

External links 
 Nemaplex, University of California - Meloidogyne javanica

Tylenchida
Agricultural pest nematodes
Food plant pathogens and diseases
Grape pest nematodes
Non-food crop diseases